The 1938 Dunedin mayoral election was part of the New Zealand local elections held that same year. In 1938, elections were held for the Mayor of Dunedin plus other local government positions including twelve city councillors. The polling was conducted using the standard first-past-the-post electoral method.

Edwin Cox, the incumbent Mayor, sought re-election for a third term, a feat never before achieved in Dunedin. Cox was unsuccessful in this and was beaten by Andrew Allen.

Mayoral results

Council results

References

Mayoral elections in Dunedin
1938 elections in New Zealand
Politics of Dunedin
1930s in Dunedin